Charmont is a commune in the Val-d'Oise department and Île-de-France region of France.

With just 30 inhabitants in 2015, Charmont is the least populated commune in the department and region.

Geography

The commune is located approximately 52 km from the center of Paris.

See also
Communes of the Val-d'Oise department

References

External links

Association of Mayors of the Val d'Oise 

Communes of Val-d'Oise